Archibald Fraser may refer to:
 Archibald Fraser (industrialist) (1869–1932), Scottish-born Canadian industrialist
 Archibald Fraser (politician) (1896–1979), Australian politician and judge
 Archibald Campbell Fraser of Lovat (1736–1815), former British Member of Parliament
 Archie Fraser (born 1959), Scottish professional football player
 Archie Fraser (ice hockey) (1914–1993), Canadian ice hockey player